{{DISPLAYTITLE:Omicron2 Canis Majoris}}

Omicron2 Canis Majoris (ο2 CMa, ο2 Canis Majoris) is a star in the constellation Canis Major. Since 1943, the spectrum of this star has served as one of the stable anchor points by which other stars are classified. It has an apparent visual magnitude of 3.043, making it one of the brighter members of the constellation. The distance to this star is roughly 2,800 light years (800 parsecs), with a 34% margin of error.

Properties

This is a massive supergiant star with a stellar classification of B3 Ia, indicating that, at the age of around 7 million years, it has exhausted the supply of hydrogen at its core and is now undergoing nuclear fusion of helium to generate energy. It has about 21 times the mass of the Sun and 65 times the Sun's radius. In all likelihood, it will end its life as a Type II supernova.

Omicron2 Canis Majoris is one of the most luminous stars known, as it radiates about 220,000 times as much luminosity as the Sun from its outer envelope at a temperature of 15,500 K. At this heat, the star is glowing with the blue-white hue of a B-type star. This star is classified as an Alpha Cygni-type variable star that undergoes periodic non-radial pulsations, which cause its brightness to cycle from magnitude +2.93 to +3.08 over a 24.44 day interval. It is losing mass from its stellar wind at the rate of around  times the mass of the Sun per year, or the equivalent of the Sun's mass every 500 million years.

Collinder 121
While this star lies in the field of view of the open cluster named Collinder 121, it is unlikely to be a member. In fact, its optical neighbor, the orange supergiant ο1 Canis Majoris has a much higher likelihood of 23.1% based upon its proper motion being a closer match to the motion of the cluster. Although they are located near each other on the celestial sphere, ο1 CMa and ο2 CMa are most likely not gravitationally bound to each other as they appear to lie many light years apart.

Name
In the catalogue of stars in the Calendarium of Al Achsasi Al Mouakket, this star was designated Thanih al Adzari (ثاني ألعذاري - thaanii al-aðārii), which was translated into Latin as Secunda Virginum, meaning the second virgin. This star, along with ε CMa (Adhara), δ CMa (Wezen) and η CMa (Aludra), were Al ʽAdhārā (ألعذاري), the Virgins.

References

Canis Major
Alpha Cygni variables
Canis Majoris, Omicron2
B-type supergiants
Canis Majoris, 24
Durchmusterung objects
033977
053138
2653